The rufous-crowned babbler (Malacopteron magnum) is a species of bird in the family Pellorneidae.
It is found in Brunei, Indonesia, Malaysia, Myanmar, the Philippines, and Thailand.
Its natural habitat is subtropical or tropical moist lowland forest.
It is threatened by habitat loss.

References

Collar, N. J. & Robson, C. 2007. Family Timaliidae (Babblers)  pp. 70 – 291 in; del Hoyo, J., Elliott, A. & Christie, D.A. eds. Handbook of the Birds of the World, Vol. 12. Picathartes to Tits and Chickadees. Lynx Edicions, Barcelona.

rufous-crowned babbler
Birds of Malesia
rufous-crowned babbler
rufous-crowned babbler
Taxonomy articles created by Polbot